Scandinavian Airlines, more commonly known and styled as SAS, is the flag carrier of Denmark, Norway, and Sweden. SAS is an abbreviation of the company's full name, Scandinavian Airlines System or legally Scandinavian Airlines System Denmark-Norway-Sweden. Part of the SAS Group and headquartered at the SAS Frösundavik Office Building in Solna, Sweden, the airline operates 180 aircraft to 90 destinations (as of December 2019). The airline's main hub is at Copenhagen-Kastrup Airport, with connections to 109 destinations around the world. Stockholm Arlanda Airport (with 106 destinations) is the second largest hub, with Oslo Airport, Gardermoen being the third major hub of SAS. Minor hubs also exist at Bergen Airport, Flesland, Göteborg Landvetter Airport, Stavanger Airport, Sola, and Trondheim Airport, Værnes. SAS Cargo is an independent, wholly owned subsidiary of Scandinavian Airlines and its main office is at Copenhagen Airport.

In 2017, SAS carried 28.6 million passengers, achieving revenues of 40 billion Swedish kronor. This makes it the eighth-largest airline in Europe and the largest in Denmark and Sweden. The SAS fleet is composed of 180 aircraft consisting of Airbus A319, Airbus A320, Airbus A320neo, Airbus A321, Airbus A330, Airbus A350, and Boeing 737 Next Generation aircraft. SAS also wet leases Airbus A320neo, ATR 72, and Bombardier CRJ900 aircraft.

The airline was founded in 1946 as a consortium to pool the transatlantic operations of Swedish airline Svensk Interkontinental Lufttrafik, Norway's Det Norske Luftfartselskap and Det Danske Luftfartselskab of Denmark. The consortium was extended to cover European and domestic cooperation two years later. In 1951, all the airlines were merged to create SAS. SAS has been described as "an icon of Norwegian–Swedish–Danish cooperation". On 27 June 2018, the Norwegian government announced that it had sold all its shares in SAS.

In 1997, SAS was a founding member of one of the major airline alliances, Star Alliance.

History

Founding 

The airline was founded on 1 August 1946, when Svensk Interkontinental Lufttrafik AB (an airline owned by the Swedish Wallenberg family), Det Danske Luftfartselskab A/S, and Det Norske Luftfartselskap AS (the flag carriers of Denmark and Norway) formed a partnership to handle the combined air traffic of these three Scandinavian countries. The first president of SAS was Per A. Norlin. On 17 September 1946, operations started under the new entity and the first international service was conducted between Stockholm and New York. Within a half-year, SAS set a new record for carrying the heaviest single piece of air cargo across the Atlantic on a scheduled passenger airliner, by shipping a 1,400-pound electrical panel from New York to the Sandvik company in Sweden.

In 1948, the Swedish flag carrier AB Aerotransport joined SAS and quickly coordinated its European operations between both carriers. Three years later, the companies formally merged to form the SAS Consortium. When established, ownership of the airline was divided between SAS Danmark (28.6%), SAS Norge (28.6%), and SAS Sverige (42.8%), all of which were owned 50% by private investors and 50% by their governments.

Transpolar route 
During 1954, SAS became the first airline to commence scheduled flights on a polar route, flying Douglas DC-6Bs from Copenhagen to Los Angeles with stops in Søndre Strømfjord (now Kangerlussuaq) in Greenland and Winnipeg in Canada. By summer 1956, traffic on the route had justified the frequency to be increased to three flights per week. The service proved relatively popular with Hollywood celebrities and members of the film industry, and the route turned out to be a publicity coup for SAS. Thanks to a tariff structure that allowed free transit to other European destinations via Copenhagen, this trans-polar route gained increasing popularity with American tourists throughout the 1950s.

In 1957, SAS was the first airline to offer around-the-world service over the North Pole via a second polar route served by Douglas DC-7Cs flying from Copenhagen to Tokyo via Anchorage International Airport in Alaska. The flight via Alaska was a compromise solution since the Soviet Union would not allow SAS, among other air carriers, to fly across Siberia between Europe and Japan, and Chinese airspace was also closed.

Jet era 

In 1959, SAS entered the jet age, having procured a number of French-built Sud Aviation Caravelles as the company's first jetliner. During the following year, another jetliner, the Douglas DC-8, was also inducted into the fleet.

In addition to modern airliners, SAS also adopted innovative operating practices and systems to improve the customer experience. In 1965, it was the first airline to introduce an electronic reservation system. During 1971, SAS introduced its first Boeing 747 jumbo jet into service. In 1982, SAS was recognised as the most punctual airline operating in Europe at that time.

During its first decades, the airline built two large hotels in central Copenhagen, SAS Royal Hotel (5 stars) and the even larger SAS Hotel Scandinavia (4 stars, with a casino on the 26th floor). In 1980, SAS opened its first hotel outside of Scandinavia, the SAS Kuwait Hotel. By 1989, SAS's hotel division owned a 40 percent share in the Intercontinental Hotels Group. Following the deregulation of commercial aviation in Europe and the competitive pressures from new rivals, SAS experienced economic difficulties (as did many incumbent flag carrier airlines) this heavily contributed to the airline's decision to sell its hotel chain to the Radisson Hotel Group during 1992.

Consolidation, acquisitions, and partnerships
In 1981, Jan Carlzon was appointed as the CEO of SAS; during his tenure, the company underwent a successful financial turnaround of the company starting in 1981 and who envisioned SAS ownership of multiple airlines worldwide. SAS gradually acquired control of the domestic markets in all three countries; this was achieved by acquiring full or partial control of various competing local airlines, including Braathens and Widerøe in Norway; Linjeflyg and Skyways Express in Sweden; and Cimber Air in Denmark. During 1989, SAS acquired 18.4% of the Texas Air Corporation, the parent company of Continental Airlines, in a bid to form a global alliance. However, this did not come about and the stake in the Texas Air Corporation was subsequently sold on. During the 1990s, SAS also acquired a 20 percent stake in British Midland, as well as purchasing 95 percent of Spanair, the second-largest airline in Spain, in addition to Air Greenland.

During the early 1990s, SAS unsuccessfully tried to merge itself with the Dutch airline KLM, along with Austrian Airlines and Swissair, in a proposed combined entity commonly called Alcazar. However, months of negotiations towards this ambitious merger ultimately collapsed due to multiple unsettled issues; this strategic failure heavily contributed to the departure of Carlzon that same year and his replacement by Jan Reinås. The airline marked its 50th year of operation on 1 August 1996 with the harmonization and name of SAS's parent company to SAS Danmark A/S, SAS Norge ASA and SAS Sverige AB. During May 1997, SAS became a founding member of the global Star Alliance network, joining with airlines such as Air Canada, Lufthansa, Thai Airways International, and United Airlines.

In June 2001, the ownership structure of SAS was changed, with a holding company being created in which the holdings of the governments changed to Sweden (21.4%), Norway (14.3%), and Denmark (14.3%), while the remaining 50 percent of shares were publicly held and traded on the stock market. During 2004, SAS was again restructured, being divided into four separate companies: SAS Scandinavian Airlines Sverige AB, SAS Scandinavian Airlines Danmark A/S, SAS Braathens AS, and SAS Scandinavian International AS. SAS Braathens was re-branded SAS Scandinavian Airlines Norge AS in 2007. However, during October 2009, the four companies were once again united into one company, named SAS Scandinavian System AB.

Restructuring 
 
With the growth of budget airlines and decreasing fares in Scandinavia, the business experienced financial hardship. By 2009, competitive pressures had compelled the airline to launch a cost-cutting initiative. In the first step of which, the business sold its stakes in other companies, such as British Midland International, Spanair, and airBaltic, and began to restructure its operations. During January 2009, an agreement to divest more than 80 percent of the holdings in Spanair was signed with a Catalan group of investors led by Consorci de Turisme de Barcelona and Catalana d'Inciatives. These changes reportedly reduced the airliner's expenses by around 23 per cent between 2008 and 2011.

In November 2012, the company came under heavy pressure from its owners and banks to implement even heavier cost-cutting measures as a condition for continued financial support. Negotiations with the respective trade unions took place for more than a week and exceeded the original deadline; in the end, an agreement was reached between SAS and the trade unions that would increase the work time, cutting employee's salaries by between 12 and 20 percent, along with reductions to the pension and retirement plans; these measures were aimed at keeping the airline as an operating concern. SAS criticized how it handled the negotiations, having reportedly denied facilities to the union delegations.

During 2017, SAS announced that it was forming a new airline, Scandinavian Airlines Ireland, operating out of Heathrow Airport and Málaga Airport to fly European routes on its parent's behalf using nine Airbus A320neos. SAS sought to replace its own aircraft with cheaper ones crewed and based outside Scandinavia to compete better with other airlines. The Swedish Pilots Union expressed its dissatisfaction with the operational structure of the new airline, suggesting it violated the current labour-agreements. The Swedish Cabin Crew Union also condemned the new venture and stated that SAS established the airline to "not pay decent salaries" to cabin crew.

In 2018, SAS announced that it had placed an order for 50 Airbus A320neo narrow-body jetliners to facilitate the creation of a single-type fleet. That same year, the Norwegian government divested its stake in the airline. As part of an environmental initiative launched by San Francisco International Airport (SFO), SAS flights operating out of SFO since December 2018 have been supplied with sustainable aviation fuel from Shell and SkyNRG.

In July 2021, the European Commission has approved a Swedish and Danish aid measure of approximately US$356 million to support SAS. In September 2021, SAS announced that it would establish two operating subsidiaries; SAS Connect and SAS Link, with its existing SAS Ireland subsidiary to be rebranded as the new SAS Connect, while SAS Link would initially operate the airline's Emrbaer E195 aircraft, and the operations of both companies to begin by early 2022.

Following little progress with SAS's restructuring plan, SAS Forward, the Swedish government announced on 7 June 2022 that Sweden, which owns 21.8% of the company, would not inject new capital into SAS and that it did "not aim to be a long-term shareholder in the company". The airline filed for Chapter 11 bankruptcy  protection in the United States on 5 July 2022.

In September 2022, SAS announced it was returning at least ten aircraft to lessors, including five long-haul aircraft - amongst them two barely two year old Airbus A350s. This measure is a result of the closure of Russian airspace for flights to Asia which caused a severe drop in demand and efficiency. As of November 2022, SAS announced it was searching for a buyer for one of their Airbus A350 aircraft.

Corporate affairs

Business trends
The key trends for Scandinavian Airlines Group (which includes SAS Cargo, SAS Ground Handling, and SAS Tech), are shown below (since 2012, for years ending 31 October):

Head office

Between 2011 and 2013, the head office was located at Stockholm Arlanda Airport (ARN) in Sigtuna Municipality, Sweden. The SAS Cargo Group A/S head office is in Kastrup, Tårnby Municipality, Denmark.

The SAS Frösundavik Office Building, was designed by Niels Torp Architects and built between 1985 and 1987. The move from Solna to Arlanda was completed in 2010. A previous SAS head office was located on the grounds of Bromma Airport in Stockholm. In 2013 SAS announced that it once again would relocate to Frösundavik.

Emissions
Data for passengers, aircraft and profit from section Business Trends above.

In contrast to most other businesses and private individuals in Sweden, airlines are exempt from the Swedish carbon tax. Had SAS paid the Swedish carbon tax level of SEK1180 (EUR114) per tonne for all of its emissions, it would have had significant impact on recent profit levels. Since 2012 airlines are included in the EU ETS. In January 2013 the price for extra emission rights on top of the granted were approximately EUR 6.3 per tonne. In May 2017 the price was EUR 4.9 per tonne.

Destinations

Codeshare agreements
Scandinavian Airlines has codeshare agreements with the following airlines:

 Aegean Airlines
 Air Canada
 Air China
 airBaltic
 All Nippon Airways
 Asiana Airlines
 Austrian Airlines
 Croatia Airlines
 EgyptAir
 Ethiopian Airlines
 Etihad Airways
 Icelandair
 LOT Polish Airlines
 Lufthansa
 Luxair
 Singapore Airlines
 South African Airways
 Swiss International Air Lines
 Thai Airways International
 Turkish Airlines
 United Airlines
 Widerøe

Interline agreements
Scandinavian Airlines has interlining agreements with the following airlines:
 Air Greenland
 Pakistan International Airlines

Fleet

Current fleet
, Scandinavian Airlines operates the following aircraft under its own register:

, Scandinavian Airlines also has the following aircraft operated by its subsidiaries and other carriers under wetlease agreements:

Future fleet plans

Short haul

On 20 June 2011, SAS announced an order for 30 new A320neo aircraft as part of its fleet harmonization plan. SAS' stated goal is to have an all-Airbus fleet at its bases in Stockholm and Copenhagen by 2019, with a mixed A320neo and A320ceo fleet operation at both bases. The base in Oslo will then operate mostly Boeing 737-800 aircraft, with a few 737-700s also being retained. The older, smaller 737-600s are disposed of in 2019. The first order of A320neos was delivered in October 2016. In April 2018, SAS announced an order of 50 more A320neos to replace all 737NGs and older A320ceos in service as part of its goal to have an all-Airbus fleet by 2023.

Long haul
On 25 June 2013, SAS and Airbus signed a Memorandum of Understanding stating that SAS intends to buy twelve new-generation aircraft, including six options. The agreement consists of eight A350-900s with six options and four A330-300Es. The first new long-haul aircraft to enter service will be the A330-300E, which was originally planned to replace the aging A340-300s in 2015 as leasing agreements on these aircraft expire. Instead, SAS renewed the leasing agreements to be able to expand its long-haul fleet and used the new A330-300Es to add more long-haul destinations to its network.

The first 6 of 8 Airbus A350-900s for SAS were delivered to the airline in 2019 and were to be to operate long-haul routes from 2020. The A350 will first fly on the Copenhagen and Chicago route, with the airline planning Beijing, New York, Tokyo, Shanghai, Hong Kong and San Francisco when more A350 are delivered.

Livery

In September 2019, SAS unveiled an all-new livery, which will initially be showcased on a new A350 and an A320neo, before gradually being rolled out to the whole fleet. SAS expects the whole fleet to be repainted by 2024. The fuselage is kept in a light beige with the "SAS" logotype in silver displayed prominently across the height of the front section. The vertical stabilizer and adjacent parts of the fuselage are blue, with the SAS logo in white shown on the stabilizer. The blue area on the rear fuselage extends towards the front in a curved line. The horizontal stabilizers are beige (except for the ATR-72 aircraft, where they are blue). Winglets are blue as well. The engine casings are beige with a vertical blue stripe at the front and bear the word "Scandinavian" in blue. "Scandinavian" in large blue letters is also displayed on the underbelly of the aircraft.

The previous livery was introduced in 1998 and was designed by SthlmLab (Stockholm Design Lab). SAS aircraft look predominantly white; however, the fuselage is in a very light beige (Pantone Warm Gray 2/Pantone 9083C) with "Scandinavian" above the windows in silver lettering (Pantone 877) and "Airlines" below the windows in white. The typeface used is Rotis Semi Serif. The vertical stabilizer (and winglets) are painted blue (Pantone 2738C) with the classic white SAS logo on it. It is a variant of the traditional SAS logotype, slimmed slightly and stylized by the design company Stockholm Design Lab as part of the SAS livery change. The engine casing is painted in scarlet (Pantone Warm Red/Pantone 179C) with the word Scandinavian in white, the thrust reversers in the color of the fuselage. All other text is painted in Pantone Warm Gray 9. The design also features stylized versions of the Scandinavian flags. All aircraft are named, traditionally after Vikings.

Apart from the standard livery, SAS also operates an Airbus A319-100 in retro livery and two Boeing 737s in Star Alliance livery.

Cabin

SAS Business
On long-haul flights business class, called SAS Business, is offered and features wide sleeper seats. On the A330s and A350s seating is 1-2-1 on seats that convert into  flat beds, with power sockets and a  entertainment screen. On the A321LRs business class has alternating 2-2 and 1-1 seating, all convertible to flat beds.

SAS Plus
Plus is SAS' premium economy class. On the A330s seating is 2-3-2, 2-4-2 on the A350s and on the A321LR it is 2-2. The seats offered on SAS Plus are wider than those in the SAS Go section.

On European flights, SAS Plus tickets are refundable and include a meal, a double checked-in baggage allowance, and access to lounges and fast track security at the airport. The SAS Plus passengers are seated at the front of the aircraft and passengers can choose their seat at booking for free, but the seats there are otherwise the same as the SAS Go seats. The two-class system was introduced in June 2013, when business class was eliminated from intra-European flights.

SAS Go
SAS Go, or economy, offers 3-3 seating on intracontinental flights, 2-4-2 on the A330s and 3-3-3 on the A350s.

SAS offers free coffee and tea to GO passengers on short-haul services, except very short flights like Bergen-Stavanger or Stockholm-Visby. Meals are served to all passengers on long-haul flights.

SAS Go Light
SAS Go Light is a variant of SAS Go with no checked luggage included. Tickets are sold in the same booking class as SAS Go and are otherwise identical. As of 14 December 2017, SAS Go Light is available on both European and long-haul flights. It is not available on flights within the Nordic countries. SAS Go Light is aimed at competing with low-cost carriers for those who travel with hand luggage only. Extra luggage allowance for EuroBonus Silver, Gold, and Diamond members does not apply on SAS Go Light tickets and is only valid for EuroBonus Pandion members.

Services

EuroBonus

SAS's frequent-flyer program is called EuroBonus. Members earn points on all SAS and Widerøe flights as well as on Star Alliance flights. Around 50 percent of SAS' total revenues are generated by EuroBonus members. By August 2015, the EuroBonus program had in excess of four million members.

Wi‑Fi
During May 2018, SAS launched a new high-speed Wi‑Fi Internet access system supplied by Viasat. The service is being rolled out on both the short- and medium-haul fleets, it is expected to take two years to complete. The new system is much faster than previously available and will enable passengers to stream movies on board. Before this, SAS only offered Internet access on board on its long haul aircraft and a small number of Boeing 737s. Wi‑Fi Internet access is free for Eurobonus Gold and Diamond members as well as for those travelling in SAS Plus or Business. Otherwise, it can be purchased with EuroBonus points or for a small fee.

Awards 
 2010:
 Flightstats: World's Most Punctual Airline 
 Simpliflying: Best Use of Social Media in a Crisis Situation
 2011:
 Edge Awards: Favourite Airline
  Grand Travel Award: Europe's Best Airline
 Webbie: Online Campaign of the Year
 2012:
 Webbie Award: Online Campaign of the Year
 2013:
 Freddie Awards: Best Customer Service in Europe/Africa
 Sustainable Brand Index: Most Sustainable Airline
 2014:
 Grand Travel Award: Europe's Best Airline
 2015:
 Grand Travel Award: Europe's Best Airline
 ServiceScore: Airline with highest service standards.

Accidents and incidents

Non-aviation related incidents

Controversial advertising campaign 
On 10 February 2020, SAS released 2 minutes and 45 seconds long commercial on YouTube titled "What is truly Scandinavian?" which tells a story about company's values and highlighting the ideas and inventions that globalism brought to Scandinavia, which caused an outrage in various groups due to SAS choosing a different advertising message than usual. The original video received more than 136,000 dislikes and 16,000 likes. On 12 February 2020, SAS Group, a parent company of SAS, released a statement that they will continue with the advertising campaign despite the outrage.

On 13 February 2020, 3 days after commercial was published, SAS offices in Adelgade, Copenhagen and advertising agency &Co which produced the commercial received bomb threats. Later, a shorter 45 second version of the same commercial was republished on Facebook by SAS and official version on YouTube made private.

Responses 
Norwegian Air quickly reacted to the controversy by publishing the message "Fortunately, nobody can take away the cheese slicer from us" and an image on Facebook of a cheese slicer, which Norwegians claim to have invented.

See also

 SAS Group
 Norwegian Aviation College
 List of airports in Denmark, Norway, and Sweden
 List of the busiest airports in the Nordic countries
 Transport in Denmark, Norway, and Sweden

Notes

References

External links

Company websites
 SAS website ( - )
 SAS Denmark website
 SAS Norway website
 SAS Sweden website
 SAS Group corporate website

Other websites
 Viking Tails, Scandinavian airline history blog
 Pictures of Scandinavian Airlines fleet

 
Airlines of Denmark
Airlines of Norway
Airlines of Sweden
SAS Group members
Association of European Airlines members
Airlines established in 1946
Danish brands
Star Alliance
Companies based in Solna Municipality
Sigtuna Municipality
Swedish companies established in 1946
Danish companies established in 1946
Norwegian companies established in 1946
Companies that filed for Chapter 11 bankruptcy in 2022